Queen's Blade: Rebellion is a 2012 anime television series based on the Queen's Blade series of gamebooks by Hobby Japan. Set after the events of the original Queen Blade, Gainos and the entire Continent have fallen under a tyrannical rule led by Claudette, the Thundercloud Queen. The series focuses on Annelotte, an exiled knight who leads a band of rebels in her fight to overthrow the Queen.

The anime is produced by Arms under the directorship of Yousei Morino, with the script written by Hideki Shirane, music by Masaru Yokoyama, and characters by Rin-Sin, Takayuki Noguchi, and Yukiko Ishibashi. The anime aired on AT-X from April 3, 2012, to June 19, 2012, with subsequent broadcasts on Tokyo MX, Chiba TV, Sun Television, and BS11. AT-X airings are uncensored, while the airings on Tokyo MX and other channels are heavily censored. Six DVD and Blu-ray volumes will later be released by Media Factory, starting from June 27, 2012. Each DVD/BD volume will contain an OVA short entitled .

An OVA anime adaptation of Rebellion was bundled with the Queen's Blade Premium Visual Book and Queen's Blade Rebellion Premium Visual Book on DVD prior to the anime's official announcement. Serving as prologues, the OVAs take place after the events of Queen's Blade: Beautiful Fighters. The first set of OVAs were released on October 29, 2011, while the second set of OVAs were released on January 28, 2012. Simulcasts of the Rebellion anime are provided by Crunchyroll, starting from April 12, 2012. The anime is licensed in North America by Sentai Filmworks.

Both songs were released as CD singles on April 25, 2012.

Episode list

OVA Prelude (2011–2012)

Queen's Blade: Rebellion (2012)

OVA Specials

Exposed As I Push The Limits!?

References

External links
Official website

Queen's Blade Rebellion
Queen's Blade